Antonín Pechanec (born March 19, 1991) is a Czech professional ice hockey player. He is currently playing with AZ Havířov of the 1st Czech Republic Hockey League.

Pechanec made his Czech Extraliga debut playing with HC Oceláři Třinec during the 2014–15 Czech Extraliga season.

References

External links

1991 births
Living people
Czech ice hockey forwards
HC Oceláři Třinec players
People from Havířov
Sportspeople from the Moravian-Silesian Region
AZ Havířov players
HC Havířov players
HC ZUBR Přerov players
VHK Vsetín players
HC Frýdek-Místek players